Argentinísima II  is a 1973  Argentine musical documentary film directed and written by Fernando Ayala and Héctor Olivera. It is the sequel to the 1972 Argentinísima. The film premiered on 21 June 1973 in Buenos Aires.

Cast
Santiago Ayala
Domingo Cura
Eduardo Falú
Hernán Figueroa Reyes
Los Fronterizos
Ramona Galarza
Gina Maria Hidalgo
Luis Landriscina
Julio Marbíz
Ariel Ramírez
Edmundo Rivero
Carlos Torres Vila
Norma Viola
Atahualpa Yupanqui

External links
 

1973 films
1970s Spanish-language films
Argentine documentary films
Tango films
Films directed by Fernando Ayala
Films directed by Héctor Olivera
1970s musical films
1973 documentary films
1970s Argentine films